Collix inaequata is a moth of the  family Geometridae. This moth is endemic in La Réunion where it is found in medium altitudes.

A known foodplant of the larvae is Badula barthesia, an endemic Myrsinaceae. The larvae are green with some pink colorations.

See also
List of moths of Réunion

References

External links
boldsystems.org: Image of Collix inaequata

inaequata
Endemic fauna of Réunion
Moths of Réunion
Moths described in 1862